Elena was the second wife of tsar Ivan Asen I of Bulgaria. She was the mother of tsar Ivan Asen II of Bulgaria.

Biography
Her antecedents are unknown. She is sometimes alleged to be a daughter of Stefan Nemanja of Serbia, but this relationship is questionable and would have caused various canonical impediments to marriages between their descendants. Elena married Ivan Asen I in 1183 at the age of thirteen.

During the battles against Byzantine Empire, Elena was captured during Siege of Lovech in an ambush; when Ivan Asen ascended the throne as co-tsar, he sent his younger brother Kaloyan to Constantinople as hostage in exchange for Elena.

By her marriage to Ivan Asen I, Elena had at least two sons:
 Ivan Asen II, emperor of Bulgaria 1218–1241
 Alexander (Aleksandăr), sebastokrator, who died after 1232; Alexander had a son named Kaliman Asen II, emperor of Bulgaria in 1256

After the assassination of Ivan Asen I in 1196, Elena retired to a convent under the monastic name Evgenia. Her memory is honored in the Synodic of Bulgarian Church:

After her son ascended the throne, Elena was honored as empress dowager.

Sources 

"Кой кой е в средновековна България", изд. къща "Петър Берон", 1999 г., 
"Фамилията на Асеневци", Божилов, Ив.

Bulgarian consorts
Year of death unknown
12th-century Bulgarian women
13th-century Bulgarian women